Petter Strand (born 24 August 1994) is a Norwegian footballer who plays as a midfielder for Vålerenga. He has previously played for Fyllingsdalen, Sogndal, Molde and Brann.

Career
Strand joined Sogndal in 2014. He made his debut for Sogndal in a 3–0 defeat against Stabæk.

On 28 January 2016, Strand joined Molde FK. He made his Molde debut in a 2–1 win against Stabæk on 20 March 2016.

On 14 January 2019, Strand joined SK Brann on a free transfer.

Career statistics

References 

1994 births
Living people
Footballers from Bergen
Norwegian footballers
Norway under-21 international footballers
FK Fyllingsdalen players
Sogndal Fotball players
Molde FK players
SK Brann players
Eliteserien players
Norwegian First Division players
Association football midfielders